Karin Metze (later Ulbricht, born 21 August 1956) is a German rower who competed for East Germany in the 1976 Summer Olympics and in the 1980 Summer Olympics.

She was born in Meissen. In 1976, she was a crew member of the East German boat, which won the gold medal in the coxed four event. Four years later, she won her second gold medal with the East German boat in the eight competition.

References

External links
 

1956 births
Living people
East German female rowers
Olympic rowers of East Germany
Rowers at the 1976 Summer Olympics
Rowers at the 1980 Summer Olympics
Olympic gold medalists for East Germany
Olympic medalists in rowing
Medalists at the 1980 Summer Olympics
Medalists at the 1976 Summer Olympics
World Rowing Championships medalists for East Germany
People from Meissen
Sportspeople from Saxony